Salamander Bay is a suburb of the Port Stephens local government area in the Hunter Region of New South Wales, Australia. The Worimi people are the traditional owners of the Port Stephens area. Named after the adjacent shallow bay, itself named after Salamander, a convict ship from the Third Fleet, which was the first European vessel to enter Port Stephens (1791), it is a mainly residential suburb with a large shopping centre. At the 2021 census, Salamander Bay had a population of 4,991. It is home to Tomaree High School, a TAFE facility and St Phillips Christian College (Port Stephens Campus).

Notes

References

Suburbs of Port Stephens Council
Bays of New South Wales
Beaches of New South Wales